ORP Bałtyk is a fleet tanker of the Polish Navy. The ship was designed and built in the Stocznia Gdynia shipyard, Poland. She was launched in 1988 and commissioned on 11 March 1991.

In April 2016, the Polish Government launched a tender to replace the vessel with a new class to enter service between 2017 and 2020. The new vessel will be required to store 1,500 tonnes of fuel, 200 tonnes of water as well as up to three twenty foot shipping containers.

References

Auxiliary ships of Poland
1988 ships
Tankers
261217000